Domenico Olivieri may refer to:

Domenico Olivieri (painter) (1679-1755), Italian painter
Domenico Olivieri (footballer) (born 1968), Belgian footballer and football manager